Louis Stynen (16 March 1907 – 14 May 1991) was a Belgian architect. His work was part of the architecture event in the art competition at the 1932 Summer Olympics.

References

1907 births
1991 deaths
20th-century Belgian architects
Olympic competitors in art competitions
People from Borgerhout